The Brandon University Students' Union (BUSU) represents undergraduate, graduate, and distance students at Brandon University (BU) in Manitoba, Canada. BUSU is a not-for-profit organization that represents 3,375 (2020) students. BUSU was incorporated in 1969, and joined the Canadian Federation of Students (CFS) as Local 37 in 1984.

BUSU hosts a variety of events such as speakers, socials, and free food giveaways as well as organizing orientation events at the beginning of each September and January.

BUSU is contracted by the Knowles-Douglas Commission to maintain the day-to-day operations of the Knowles-Douglas Centre, which includes the campus bookstore, Forbidden Flavors, and The Quill as tenants.

The BUSU office is located on the first floor of the Knowles-Douglas Centre at Brandon University.

Services
The BUSU office functions as the central lost and found for BU. Each year the students' union produces about 3,000 student planners, which are available to students for free. The handbook provides information about the university and the students' union along with a weekly calendar for students to track course assignments and all of their extra curricular activities. BUSU and BU each contribute $15,000 annually to the work study program. The funding is granted to professors and other members of the BU community to hire students to assist in research projects, or in other engagement with the local community.

BUSU and BU each contribute $6,000 annually to the Student Travel & Conference Fund. This service is intended to assist students in covering their travel expenses and conference fees associated with participation in off-campus learning experiences. BUSU works closely with the BU Career Planning office and other employers to provide students with a current website for part-time and summer jobs. In 2015 the Assiniboine Community College Students' Association (ACCSA) and BUSU began a partnership to implement a student discount program with participating businesses throughout Brandon.

Between May 2015 and April 2016 over 300 hampers were distributed helping almost 900 people by the food bank. Every year BUSU hosts the Halloween Food Drive. Student clubs from BU compete to collect the most weight of non-perishable food by trick-or-treating around Brandon. In 2008, Brandon University students voted in favor of creating a Health and Dental Plan for students who do not have alternative coverage. BUSU administers the Health and Dental plan provided by C&C Insurance and Student VIP.

Collectives
BUSU funds, houses, and helps organize four Collectives on the BU campus. The Collectives have guaranteed funding from BUSU each year and deal primarily with topics of gender, expression, diversity, nationality, and inclusion.
Gender Empowerment Collective
 LGBTTQ* Collective
 Indigenous Student Collective
 International Students' Collective
Racialized Students' Collective

Fees
The following are fees collected by BUSU through the Brandon University.
Brandon University Students' Union Membership: This fee goes towards the student union's annual operating budget to provide services and governance for students, in addition to organizing events, activities, and campaigns.
Knowles Douglas Centre (KDC) Student Building Fund: This fee covers the day to day operating costs of the Knowles Douglas Centre, also known as the Student Union Building. Costs such as maintenance, repairs, hydro, steam, water, and cleaning. Surplus funds from this fee are allocated towards increasing student space on campus.
Health and Dental: Only students registered in 12 credit hours or more from September to April or Graduate students are automatically enrolled in the plan. This fee provides students with comprehensive Health & Dental coverage all year.
U-Pass (Brandon Transit): This fee provides all students on the Brandon campus with access to regular Brandon Transit Bus service all year.
Canadian Federation of Students Membership: All members of BUSU are also members of the CFS. The CFS provides students with a range of services from the International Student Identity Card (ISIC) to government lobbying on a provincial and national level.
Quill Levy: This levy allows for BU students to have access to a weekly Student newspaper, both in print and online.
World University Service of Canada: The World University Service of Canada (WUSC) provides funding for refugee students to attend university in Canada. This fee helps sponsor two refugee students to attend BU.

Campaigns 
BUSU runs a number of campaigns in conjunction with the CFS on a number of social, economic, and educational issues. On occasion, BUSU decides that larger actions are necessary to spread awareness and lobby the government about pressing issues.

All Out Nov 2
On November 2, 2016, BUSU and the CFS held rallies at Brandon University and the Manitoba Legislature in Support of Bill 15, The Sexual Violence Awareness and Prevention Act, the creation of an Indigenous course requirement, the removal of mandatory attendance requirements, and halting the increase of differential fees for international students. The Manitoba Government passed Bill 15 in April 2017.

#Scrap Bill 31
On October 25 and 26, 2017, BUSU and the CFS held rallies at Brandon University and the Manitoba Legislature in Opposition of Bill 31, The Advanced Education Administration Amendment Act, which would allow tuition hikes of up to 5% plus inflation every year and deregulates course-related fees. Over 200 students rallied at Brandon University, and more than 50 people spoke out in opposition at the public hearing on Bill 31. On Nov 10, 2017, the Manitoba government passed Bill 31. On March 17, 2018, BUSU President Nick Brown proposed a motion to the Brandon University Board of Governors to keep tuition increases to a maximum of the rate of inflation, but it was defeated.

Controversies

Brandon University Students For Life
In November 2015 BUSU did not accept the application for Club Status from the Brandon University Students for Life (BUSL). In August 2016 BUSL took legal action against BUSU, suing for reinstatement of Club Status.

At the Fall 2016 Annual General Meeting, the following motion was passed:

2020 Election Interference
During the 2020 BUSU Election the Elections and Referenda Disciplinary Interpretation and Enforcement Board (ERDIE) received multiple reports regarding "intimidation, threat, or undue influence". The ERDIE Board investigation resulted in the candidates for President and Vice President Internal, Olusola Akintola and Janet Akintola respectively, being disqualified from the election. Olusola and Janet filed a legal application calling for the courts to order BUSU to ratify the results of the election and stated that there is "a conspiracy to prevent some of us from taking office". Janet was reinstated on June 3, and Olusola on July 13 after an independent investigation could not substantiate the evidence of the allegations. A notice of abandonment of the lawsuit was also filed on July 13. On August 10, Olusola resigned stating that, "I needed to move on, actually, I just wanted to fight to get my name back. I didn't like the way I was being treated and I fought to get it back. Once I got it back, I just felt ‘well, let me just leave.’" On October 5, 2020, BUSU put out an ad to fill the vacant position of Vice President Internal, indicating that Janet had also resigned.

Elected Positions
The BUSU Council is elected on an annual basis from May 1 to April 30 every year. The General Election takes place around reading week in late February.

The BUSU Council currently has 17 positions:

Executive
 President
 Vice President Internal
 Vice President External
Directors
 Arts Director
 Science Director
 Health Studies Director
 Music Director
 Education Director
 Graduate Studies Director
 Part-Time/Mature Students Director
 Women's Director
 Indigenous Peoples' Director
 Queer Students' Director
 International Students' Director
 Residence Director
 Accessibilities Director
 Racialized Director

See also 
 List of Canadian students' associations
 Canadian Federation of Students

References

External links

Brandon University

Students' associations in Canada
Brandon University